Hilde Wagener (26 September 1904 – 26 December 1992) was a German-born actress who settled in Austria. Primarily a stage actress, she also appeared in several films, such as The Burning Secret (1933), generally in supporting roles.

Selected filmography
 The Burning Secret (1933)
 Premiere (1937)
 Such Great Foolishness (1937)
 Happiness is the Main Thing (1941)
 Victoria in Dover (1954)
 Sissi (1955)
 Three Men in the Snow (1955)
 Ich suche Dich (1956)
 The Black Cobra (1963)

References

External links

Bibliography 
 Goble, Alan. The Complete Index to Literary Sources in Film. Walter de Gruyter, 1999.

1904 births
1992 deaths
German film actresses
German stage actresses
Austrian film actresses
Austrian stage actresses
Actors from Hanover
20th-century German actresses
20th-century Austrian actresses
Commanders Crosses of the Order of Merit of the Federal Republic of Germany